Max Hauri (30 December 1941 – 6 December 2015) was a Swiss equestrian. He competed at the 1964 Summer Olympics and the 1972 Summer Olympics.

References

External links
 

1941 births
2015 deaths
Swiss male equestrians
Olympic equestrians of Switzerland
Equestrians at the 1964 Summer Olympics
Equestrians at the 1972 Summer Olympics
Place of birth missing